Pllaja e Pusit is a mountain peak located in south-eastern Albania. Pllaja e Pusit is not only the highest peak of Mali i Thatë but also the highest peak of the mountains separating Lake Ohrid and Lake Prespa. To the north - west of Pllaja e Pusit is Lake Ohrid and to the east of this peak is Lake Prespa. One of the largest settlements found near the peak is Liqenas.

References

Mountains of Albania